

Beorhthelm  was Bishop of Winchester sometime between 959, when the previous bishop became Archbishop of Canterbury, and late 963, when the next bishop was consecrated.

Notes

Citations

References

External links
 

Bishops of Winchester
Year of birth unknown
Year of death unknown
10th-century English bishops